Zougla is a Greek television talk show presented by the journalist Makis Triantafyllopoulos. Subjects include news, revelations, and political scandals. It aired on Alpha TV, then on Star Channel, then Alter Channel, then Alpha TV again, and then after controversy over the content of an episode back to Alter Channel. Triantafyllopoulos discussed government corruption but did not show evidence that he claims he has proving the allegations he has made, prompting government regulators to fine Alpha TV and him personally. After a discussion with station owner Dimitris Kontominas, Triantafyllopoulos quit. It was later announced that his shows would be returning to the airwaves this time on Alter Channel.

The name Zougla means "jungle" in Greek. The show always features jungle-like scenery with a jeep, plants and huts, and has been always broadcast at the evening of each Thursday. During his first years of presenting, Triantafyllopoulos presented the show with his pet parrot, Fidel, who died during a fire at the set.

External links
 

Alpha TV original programming
Star Channel (Greek TV channel) original programming
Alter Channel original programming
1996 Greek television series debuts
1990s Greek television series
2000s Greek television series
2010s Greek television series
Greek-language television shows